The 2022 Hungarian Grand Prix was a tennis tournament played on outdoor clay courts. It was the 20th edition of the Budapest Grand Prix, a 250-level tournament on the 2022 WTA Tour. It took place at Római Tennis Academy in Budapest, Hungary, from 11 through 17 July 2022.

Champions

Singles 

  Bernarda Pera def.  Aleksandra Krunić 6–3, 6–3

This is Pera's first ever WTA singles title.

Doubles 

  Ekaterine Gorgodze /  Oksana Kalashnikova def.  Katarzyna Piter /  Kimberley Zimmermann 1–6, 6–4, [10–6]

Singles main draw entrants

Seeds 

† Rankings are as of 27 June 2022

Other entrants 
The following players received wildcard entry into the singles main draw:
  Tímea Babos
  Réka Luca Jani
  Natália Szabanin

The following players received entry with a protected ranking:
  Laura Siegemund

The following players received entry from the qualifying draw:
  Carolina Alves
  Kateryna Baindl
  Jesika Malečková
  Despina Papamichail
  Bernarda Pera
  Fanny Stollár

The following players received entry as lucky losers:
  Marina Bassols Ribera
  Laura Pigossi

Withdrawals
Before the tournament
  Claire Liu → replaced by  Dalma Gálfi
  Marta Kostyuk → replaced by  Panna Udvardy
  Tereza Martincová → replaced by  Marina Bassols Ribera
  Andrea Petkovic → replaced by  Kamilla Rakhimova
  Elena Rybakina → replaced by  Laura Pigossi
  Ajla Tomljanović → replaced by  Ekaterine Gorgodze
  Wang Xinyu → replaced by  Wang Xiyu
  Zheng Qinwen → replaced by  Ana Bogdan

Retirements
During the tournament
  Anhelina Kalinina
  Lesia Tsurenko

Doubles main draw entrants

Seeds 

† Rankings are as of 27 June 2022

Other entrants 
The following pairs received wildcard entry into main draw:
  Réka Luca Jani /  Adrienn Nagy
  Natalia Szabanin /  Luca Udvardy

Withdrawals
Before the tournament
  Marta Kostyuk /  Elena-Gabriela Ruse → replaced by  Elixane Lechemia /  Jesika Malečková
  Kaitlyn Christian /  Lidziya Marozava → replaced by  Jessy Rompies /  Hsieh Yu-chieh
  Irina Bara /  Ekaterine Gorgodze → replaced by  Ekaterine Gorgodze /  Oksana Kalashnikova

References

External links 
 

Budapest Grand Prix
Budapest Grand Prix
Budapest Grand Prix
Budapest Grand Prix